Kaleena Kiff is an American actress, producer, and director. Kiff is known for her roles in the sitcoms Love, Sidney and The New Leave It to Beaver.

Career
Kiff began her acting career in 1980. In 1982, she appeared in the NBC comedy Love, Sidney as Patricia (“Patti”) Morgan opposite Tony Randall and Swoosie Kurtz. In 1984, she landed the role of Kelly Cleaver, daughter of Wally (Tony Dow) and Mary Ellen Cleaver (Janice Kent) in the 1985 revival series The New Leave It to Beaver. After the series ended in 1989, Kiff acted sporadically in mainly bit roles.

In 2008, she produced the musical short E vuoto per amore (He Is Empty for Love), directed by Galen Fletcher, screened at the Red Rock Film Festival. Also in 2008, she directed a short film titled Alice & Huck, starring Allison Mack. The short won three accolades at The Big Easy Shorts Festival: Best Director (for herself), Best Editing, and Best Drama. 

She co-created and directed the first five episodes of the online science-fiction/fantasy webseries Riese: Kingdom Falling, which aired in 2009.

In 2014, Kiff produced the comedy thriller film The Legend of Barney Thomson (originally titled The Long Midnight of Barney Thomson).

Filmography

Awards and nominations

References

External links
 

20th-century American actresses
21st-century American actresses
Living people
American child actresses
American film actresses
American television actresses
American television directors
American voice actresses
Film producers from California
American women film directors
American women television directors
Actresses from Santa Monica, California
Film directors from California
American women film producers
Jewish American actresses
21st-century American Jews
Year of birth missing (living people)